Jōshū or Joshu may refer to:

 
 
 Jōshū, another name for Yamashiro Province
 
 Jōshū, another name for Kōzuke Province
 
 Jōshū, another name for Hitachi Province